Beach Guard in Winter is a 1976 Yugoslav film directed by Goran Paskaljević. It was entered into the 26th Berlin International Film Festival.

Cast

 Irfan Mensur as Dragan Pasanović
 Gordana Kosanović as Ljubica Miladinović
 Danilo Stojković as Milovan Pasanović (Dragan's father)
 Mira Banjac as Spasenija Pasanović (Dragan's mother)
 Dara Čalenić as Dragan's Aunt
 Bata Živojinović as Ljubica's Father
 Pavle Vuisić as Buda
 Ružica Sokić as Widow
 Faruk Begolli as Dragan's Friend
 Ana Krasojević as Ljubica's Mother
 Janez Vrhovec as Orchestra Leader
 Dragomir Felba as Chauffeur
 Bora Todorović as Petar Dunjić
 Dušan Janićijević as Film Director
 Milivoje Tomić as Laundry Boss
 Stevan Minja as Ljubica's Uncle
 Vladan Živković as Gastarbeiter

References

External links

1976 films
1976 drama films
Serbian drama films
Serbo-Croatian-language films
Films directed by Goran Paskaljević
Serbian-language films
Yugoslav drama films
Films set in Yugoslavia